Nikolay Davydenko was the defending champion, but lost to Gilles Simon in the third round.

James Blake won the title, defeating Mardy Fish 7–5, 6–4 in the final.

Draw

Finals

Section 1

Section 2

Section 3

Section 4

External links
Men's Singles Draw 
Men's Qualifying Draw 

Men's Singles